Goodbye Love is a 1933 American pre-Code comedy film directed by H. Bruce Humberstone and starring Charles Ruggles.

Plot
A wealthy financer, Chester Hamilton (Sidney Blackmer) is sent to "alimony jail" for non-payment of alimony to Sandra (Mayo Methot). Hamilton's valet, Oswald Groggs (Charles Ruggles), uses his boss’s reservations at an exclusive resort to go on vacation under the assumed identity of wealthy eccentric "Sir Oswald". Hamilton's fiancée Phyllis Van Kamp (Verree Teasdale) tries to marry "Sir Oswald" for his money. When Oswald seems to fall for her, the question is who will be left standing at the altar. Chester's trusted secretary, Dorothy Blaine, (Phyllis Barry) and a reporter, Brooks,  (Ray Walker) witness all these shenanigans.

Brooks tells Hamilton that his fiancée is actually the infamous "gold digger" Fanny Malone, who is only out for his money. To break his engagement, Hamilton sleeps with Blaine, and is photographed by a private detective. Malone almost marries "Sir Oswald", but then discovers that the supposed British millionaire "big game hunter" in Africa who has allegedly shot hundreds of animals is actually the American valet Groggs, who is neither rich nor has he been to Africa. In the meantime, Hamilton marries Blaine, the woman who truly loves him.

Cast
Charles Ruggles as Oswald Groggs
Verree Teasdale as Phyllis Van Kamp, aka Fanny Malone
Sidney Blackmer as Chester Hamilton
Phyllis Barry as Dorothy Blaine
Ray Walker as Brooks
Mayo Methot as Sandra Hamilton
John Kelly as Sergeant Dugan, the jailer
Grace Hayle as Lura "Ducky" Groggs
Luis Alberni as Tony
Richard Tucker as Eddie, Sandra Hamilton's lawyer
Edward Van Sloan as Judge
Gerald Fielding as Dunwoodie, Sandra's beau

Soundtrack
"Goodbye Love" (Written by Con Conrad, Archie Gottler and Sidney D. Mitchell)

Significance
The American scholar Michael Slowik described Goodbye Love as one of the key films in its use of non-diegetic music (music heard by the audience, but not by the characters in the film). Most of the early talkies tended to feature diegetic music (music heard by both the audience and the characters). Slowik noted that in the early scenes in the Goodbye Love set in New York where both the main characters, Hamilton and Groggs, are sent to "alimony jail", the music is downbeat and sad. Later on, when Groggs affects an English accent and poses as the millionaire big game hunter "Sir Oswald" at the resort in Atlantic City and is surrounded by adoring young women, the music become light and bubbly. The type of music played in the background during the Atlantic City segment reflects that for the first time in his entire life Groggs had become a person of importance and has even become sexy and desirable. Likewise, when the gold digger Malone steals all of Grogg's money, the music again becomes sorrowful to reflect Groggs's miserable mood as he finds that she did not love him as she claimed and he is once again reduced back down to being a humble valet. In the scene where Hamilton is planning to be photographed having sex with someone who is not his fiancée to break his engagement, he is stunned to see the woman who has volunteered for this task is his secretary Dorthey Blaine who appears in her lingerie and declares her love for him; the music in this scene is lush and romantic as Blaine finally is able to express her feelings for Hamilton.

Books

References

External links

1933 films
1933 comedy films
American black-and-white films
American comedy films
1930s English-language films
Films directed by H. Bruce Humberstone
1930s American films